Harold de Vance Land (December 18, 1928 – July 27, 2001) was an American hard bop and post-bop tenor saxophonist. Land developed his hard bop playing with the Max Roach/Clifford Brown band into a personal, modern style, often rivalling Clifford Brown's instrumental ability with his own inventive and whimsical solos. His tone was strong and emotional, yet hinted at a certain introspective fragility.

Biography
Land was born in Houston, Texas, United States and grew up in San Diego, California. He started playing at the age of 16. He made his first recording as the leader of the Harold Land All-Stars, for Savoy Records in 1949. In 1954, he joined the Clifford Brown/Max Roach Quintet, with whom he was at the forefront of the hard-bop/bebop movement. The Land family moved from San Diego to Los Angeles, in 1955. There he played with Curtis Counce, led his own groups, and co-led groups with Bobby Hutcherson, Blue Mitchell, and Red Mitchell. From the 1970s onwards, his style showed the influence of John Coltrane.

In the early 1980s through to the early 1990s he worked regularly with the Timeless All Stars, a group sponsored by the Timeless jazz record label. The group consisted of Land on tenor, Cedar Walton on piano, Buster Williams on bass, Billy Higgins on drums, Curtis Fuller on trombone and Bobby Hutcherson on vibes. Land also toured with his own band during this time, often including his son, Harold Land Jr., on piano and usually featuring Bobby Hutcherson and Billy Higgins as well. During these years he played regularly at Hop Singh's in Marina Del Rey in the L.A. area and the Keystone Korner in San Francisco.

Land was a professor at the University of California, Los Angeles. He joined the UCLA Jazz Studies Program as a lecturer in 1996 to teach instrumental jazz combo. "Harold Land was one of the major contributors in the history of the jazz saxophone," said jazz guitarist Kenny Burrell, founder and director of the UCLA Jazz Studies Program.

Land died in July 2001, from a stroke, at the age of 72.

The progressive rock band Yes included a song "Harold Land" on their eponymous debut album in 1969. In a news/blog post on 20 September 2010, Bill Bruford commented about the song - "Harold Land was a hard-bop tenor saxophone player, dead now, but quite why we named a song after him I can't remember."

Playing style
Land had an inimitably dark tone within the hard-bop and modal jazz paradigms. Over time this would contrast more and more with the brighter tonalities of more Coltrane-influenced saxophonists, although Land started to implement Coltrane's musical innovations. Land's "dire, brooding [tenor saxophone] sound began somewhere between rhythm and blues and Coleman Hawkins, and after the early 1960s owed more and more to John Coltrane's harmonies, phrasing and experiments with modalism."

Discography

As leader
 1958: Harold in the Land of Jazz (Contemporary)
 1959: The Fox (HiFi Jazz) 
 1960: West Coast Blues! (Jazzland)
 1960: Eastward Ho! Harold Land in New York (Jazzland)
 1960: Take Aim (Blue Note) - released 1980
 1961: Hear Ye! (Atlantic) as the Red Mitchell-Harold Land Quintet
 1963: Jazz Impressions of Folk Music (Imperial)
 1967: The Peace-Maker (Cadet)
 1971: A New Shade of Blue (Mainstream)
 1971: Choma (Burn) (Mainstream)
 1972: Damisi (Mainstream)
 1977: Mapenzi with Blue Mitchell (Concord Jazz)
 1981: Xocia's Dance (Muse)
 1995: A Lazy Afternoon (Postcards)
 2001: Promised Land (Audiophoric)
With the Timeless All Stars
It's Timeless (Timeless, 1982)
Timeless Heart (Timeless, 1983)
Essence (Delos, 1986)
Time for the Timeless All Stars (Early Bird, 1990)

As sideman
With Roy Ayers
Virgo Vibes (Atlantic, 1967)
With Jimmy Bond
James Bond Songbook (Mirwood, 1966)
With Clifford Brown and Max Roach
Jam Session (EmArcy, 1954) - with Maynard Ferguson and Clark Terry
Brown and Roach Incorporated (EmArcy, 1954)
Daahoud (Mainstream, 1954 [1973])
Clifford Brown & Max Roach (EmArcy, 1954–55)
Study in Brown (EmArcy, 1955)
With Donald Byrd
Ethiopian Knights (Blue Note, 1971)
With Dolo Coker
Dolo! (Xanadu, 1976)
With Curtis Counce
The Curtis Counce Group (Contemporary, 1956)
You Get More Bounce with Curtis Counce! (Contemporary, 1957)
Carl's Blues (Contemporary, 1957 [1960])
Sonority (Contemporary, 1957-8 [1989])
Exploring the Future (Dooto, 1958)
With Bill Evans
Quintessence (Fantasy Records, 1976)
With Victor Feldman
Vic Feldman on Vibes (Mode, 1957)
Soviet Jazz Themes (Äva, 1962)
With Ella Fitzgerald
Things Ain't What They Used to Be (And You Better Believe It) (1969)
With Red Garland
Red Alert (Galaxy, 1977)
With Herb Geller
Fire in the West (Jubilee, 1957)
With Chico Hamilton
Chic Chic Chico (Impulse!, 1965)
With Hampton Hawes
For Real! (Contemporary, 1958 [1961])
Universe (Prestige, 1972)
With Al Hibbler
Sings The Blues - Monday Every Day (Reprise, 1961)
With Billy Higgins
Bridgework (Contemporary, 1987)
¾ for Peace (Red, 1993)
Billy Higgins Quintet (Sweet Basil, 1993)
With Elmo Hope
The Elmo Hope Quintet featuring Harold Land (Pacific Jazz, 1957)
With Freddie Hubbard 
Born to Be Blue (Pablo, 1982)
With Bobby Hutcherson
Medina (Blue Note, 1969)
Total Eclipse (Blue Note, 1968)
Blow Up (Blue Note, 1969)
Now! (Blue Note, 1969)
San Francisco (Blue Note, 1970)
Head On (Blue Note, 1971)
Cirrus (Blue Note, 1974)
Inner Glow (Blue Note, 1975)
Farewell Keystone (Theresa, 1982 [1988])
With Carmell Jones
The Remarkable Carmell Jones (Pacific Jazz 1961)
Business Meeting (Pacific Jazz 1962)
With Philly Joe Jones 
Advance! (Galaxy, 1978)
Drum Song (Galaxy, 1978 [1985])
With Les McCann
Les McCann Sings (Pacific Jazz, 1961)
With Thelonious Monk
Thelonious Monk at the Blackhawk (Riverside 1960)
With Wes Montgomery 
Montgomeryland (Pacific Jazz, 1958)
Wes, Buddy and Monk Montgomery (Pacific Jazz, 1959)
Easy Groove (Pacific Jazz, 1966)
With Blue Mitchell
Stratosonic Nuances (RCA, 1975)
African Violet (Impulse!, 1977)
Summer Soft (Impulse!, 1978)
With Shorty Rogers
The Swingin' Nutcracker (RCA Victor, 1960)
An Invisible Orchard (RCA Victor, 1961 [1997])
With Frank Rosolino
Free for All (Fantasy, 1958 [1987])
With Jack Sheldon
Jack's Groove (GNP, 1961)
With Dinah Washington
Dinah Jams (EmArcy, 1955)
With Gerald Wiggins
Wiggin' Out (HiFi Jazz, 1960)
With Gerald Wilson
You Better Believe It! (Pacific Jazz, 1961)
Moment of Truth (Pacific Jazz, 1962)
Portraits (Pacific Jazz, 1964)On Stage (Pacific Jazz, 1965)Feelin' Kinda Blues (Pacific Jazz, 1965) The Golden Sword (Pacific Jazz, 1966)Live and Swinging (Pacific Jazz, 1967)Everywhere (Pacific Jazz, 1968)California Soul (Pacific Jazz, 1968)Eternal Equinox (Pacific Jazz, 1969)
 Lomelin (Discovery, 1981)Jessica (Trend, 1982)Calafia (Trend, 1985)
With Jimmy WoodsConflict'' (Contemporary, 1963)

References

External links 
Harold Land discography
 An Interview with Harold Land by Bob Rosenbaum, October 1984
 

 

1928 births
2001 deaths
American jazz saxophonists
American male saxophonists
Atlantic Records artists
Contemporary Records artists
Jazz tenor saxophonists
Mainstream Records artists
Muse Records artists
Musicians from Houston
Musicians from San Diego
Postcards Records artists
20th-century American saxophonists
Bebop saxophonists
Jazz musicians from California
Jazz musicians from Texas
20th-century American male musicians
American male jazz musicians